Bridgetown is a small village in eastern County Clare, Ireland. It is located near Killaloe and has a National School.
St. Thomas Church was originally built in 1832 and was mostly rebuilt during the renovations in 1970.

Archaeology
A small burial ground 500 meters west and a holy well, Tobernasool, 300 metres south are noted on historic maps.

See also 
 List of towns and villages in Ireland

References

External links
 St Thomas Church Profile

Towns and villages in County Clare